Calopteryx cornelia is a species of broad-winged damselfly in the family Calopterygidae.

The IUCN conservation status of Calopteryx cornelia is "least concern", with no immediate threat to the species' survival. The population is stable. The IUCN status was reviewed in 2009.

References

Further reading

 

Calopterygidae
Odonata of Asia
Insects of Japan
Endemic fauna of Japan
Insects described in 1853
Taxa named by Edmond de Sélys Longchamps
Articles created by Qbugbot